Shotlu (also Romanized as Shoţlū, Kurdish:شتلی shtli ) is a village in Chaybasar-e Sharqi Rural District, in the Central District of Poldasht County, West Azerbaijan Province, Iran. At the 2006 census, its population was 630, in 136 families.

The kurds are majiorty in the village

References 

Populated places in Poldasht County